Jerrabomberra Creek, a partly perennial stream of the Murrumbidgee catchment within the Murray–Darling basin, is located in the Capital Country region spanning both New South Wales and the Australian Capital Territory, Australia.

Jerrabomberra is derived from the Aboriginal word, meaning "afraid of lightning". The traditional custodians of the land surrounding Jerrabomberra Creek are the Ngunnawal Aboriginal people; it lies close to the lands of the neighbouring Ngarigo people.

Location and features
The creek rises in New South Wales (NSW), below Lobb Hill, between Williamsdale and Royalla, and flows generally north and north–west, before reaching its confluence with the Molonglo River into Lake Burley Griffin, to the north of Narrabundah, in South Canberra, within the Australian Capital Territory (ACT).

Jerrabomberra Wetlands
Prior to reaching Lake Burley Griffin, the creek flows through a series of significant artificially-formed wetlands, called the Jerrabomberra Wetlands, with an estimated 170 bird species, including the migratory Latham’s snipe; and eleven fish species, as well as the eastern water rat, platypus and eastern snake-necked tortoise. The wetlands include a silt trap, a series of billabongs, and a swamp.

See also

 List of rivers of Australia

References

External links
 Jerrabomberra Creek: Local Indigenous Planting List, 2004.

Geography of Canberra
Rivers of New South Wales
Rivers of the Australian Capital Territory
Murray-Darling basin